Hywel Simons (born 10 February 1970) is a British actor from Neath, Wales.

Born in Neath, he was brought up in Porthcawl. He started acting while a pupil at Porthcawl Comprehensive School, before he went on to study at LAMDA.

Simons first TV role came soon after graduation in 1993, as oil rig worker Wilf Granelli in Roughnecks. He is known for playing the role of Sergeant Craig Gilmore in the long running ITV drama The Bill. Simons can also be seen in two episodes of Little Britain, where he plays Glynn, a gay vicar featured in scenes about Dafydd Thomas (A homosexual with homophobic tendencies who believes he is the "only gay in the village").

Simons married actress Sarah Tansey in August 2005. He enjoys wood carving, using a lathe to make bowls out of pieces of wood he finds on beaches.

References

External links

1970 births
Living people
People from Neath
Alumni of the London Academy of Music and Dramatic Art
British male soap opera actors